Petra Černocká (born 24 November 1949) is a Czech singer and actress. She is a cousin of Czech actor Vlastimil Brodský.

Discography

Singles 
 Jedou vozy / Nemám ráda citoslovce (SP 1971)
 Jedou vozy (Jeda wozy kolorowe) [CD] Rabowski/M.Filípková
 Nemám ráda citoslovce P.Hannig/E.Krečmar
 (Ovečky)
 (Pastýři): Dám vše, co mám / Holka modrooká (SP 1971)
 Dám vše, co mám (Get Me Some Help) Byl-Vangarde/P.Černocký
 Holka modrooká P.Hannig/I.Havlů
 (Ovečky 1)
 Saxana / Georgie (SP 1972)
 Saxana [CD] A.Michajlov/P.Kopta
 Georgie L.Farrington/P.Vrba
 (Sbor L.Pánka 1)
 Líný štěstí / A láska musí se nám zdát (SP 1973)
 Líný štěstí (Are You Really Leavin´ Baby) P.Deasy/E.Krečmar
 A láska musí se nám zdát R.Pauls/J.Navrátil
 (Kardinálové 1 – Strýci+Jezinky 2)
 (Kardinálové): Píseň na pět řádků... (SP 1973)
 Píseň na pět řádků (Simple Song Of Freedom) [CD] B.Darin/P.Žák
 Měsíc ví, co nevím já J.Havelka/P.Černocká
 sampler: 12xZdeněk Marat (LP 1973)
 3. Kde se můj milej toulá Z.Marat/Z.Borovec
 (P.Černocká – Orch.K.Vlacha)
 [Su 13 Jan 1406]
 Mám ráda růže / Táto a mámo (SP 1974)
 Mám ráda růže [CD] V.Ivasjuk/V.Poštulka
 Táto a mámo (Over and Over) D.Boone/M.Černý
 (Kardinálové 2)
 (Kardinálové): Adié, řeknu Vám... (SP 1974)
 Adié, řeknu Vám (Ma Chi é Che Choz´e) U.Napolitano/P.Černocká-J.A.Vaculík
 Pouštím po vodě proutí [CD] Z.Merta/P.Žák
 (Kardinálové): Koukej přijít včas... (SP 1974)
 Koukej přijít včas (In This World We Live In) Germani/P.Černocký
 Teče voda, teče česká lid.
 (Kardinálové): Byl to zvláštní den... (SP 1974)
 Byl to zvláštní den Z.Merta/P.Černocká
 Rychlost má cenu zlata Z.Merta/P.Černocká
 Jarní kalendář / Pampeliška (SP 1975)
 Jarní kalendář Z.Merta/P.Žák
 Pampeliška P.Černocká
 (Kardinálové 1 – Kantiléna 2)
 (Kardinálové): Narozeniny... (SP 1977)
 Narozeniny (Snoopy Versus the Red Baron) P.Gernhard/P.Černocká
 Zítra prý ti bude sedmnáct Z.Merta/P.Žák
 Mám své chyby / Střevíčky v rose (SP 1977)
 Mám své chyby J.Vondráček/L.Borovcová
 Střevíčky v rose [CD] Z.Merta/P.Žák
 (Sbor L.Pánka 1 – Z.Merta+Kardinálové 2)
 (Kardinálové): Mississippi / Vítám tě, lásko (SP 1977)
 Mississippi [CD] W.Theunissen/R.Filip
 Vítám tě, lásko P.Černocká/P.Žák
 split: P.Černocká / J.Schelinger (SP 1978)
 Jen se pousměj Z.Hanzlová
 (Kardinálové): Zpívání v dešti... (SP 1978)
 Zpívání v dešti [CD] Z.Barták ml./J.Machek
 Snění nad hlávkou zelí Z.Merta/Z.Kupková
 (Z.Merta)
 (Kardinálové): Klub jachtový / Čekám (SP 1978)
 Klub jachtový Z.Merta/P.Žák
 Čekám [LP] Z.Merta/V.Kučera
 (Kardinálové): Cikánské štěstí... (SP 1981)
 Cikánské štěstí P.Černocká/K.Fleisleberová
 Páni, nemám zdání (To-li ješčo budět) J.Martynov/P.Černocká
 Milionář / Jsou krásy, které neumřou (SP 1984)
 Milionář (Mister Businessman) Q.a M.de Angelis/P.Žák
 Jsou krásy, které neumřou Z.Merta/P.Vrba
 (Jezinky+Kardinálové 1 – Z.Merta 2)

LP albums 
 1986 Monitor – Supraphon (Petra Černocká a Kardinálové Zdeňka Merty)
 1979 Ten kluk už dávno se mnou není – Supraphon
 1975 Lidí se ptej – Supraphon

Studio albums 
 2009 Pop galerie Supraphon
 2006 Souhvězdí střelce – Studio Michael
 2006 Se mnou si píseň broukej (20× Petra Černocká) – Sony BMG
 2005 Se mnou si píseň broukej(Story) – Universal music
 1999 Lásku blízko mám – Venkow Records
 1996 Saxana dětem – Happy Music
 1996 Tennessee Whiskey – Happy Music
 1994 Náklaďák'' – Presston

Filmography

Films

Television

References

External links
 

1949 births
Living people
20th-century Czech women singers
Musicians from Prague
Actresses from Prague
21st-century Czech women singers
Czechoslovak women singers